Slope County is a county in the U.S. state of North Dakota. As of the 2020 census, the population was 706, making it the least populous county in North Dakota and the 20th-least populous county in the United States. The county seat is Amidon.

History
The vote to create Slope County, by partitioning the lower portion of Billings, was held on November 3, 1914. This was the final (as of 2019) alteration to that once-large Dakota county, as Bowman had been partitioned off in 1883, and Golden Valley was split off in 1910. The unorganized Slope County was not attached to another county for administrative or judicial purposes during the interregnum; on January 14, 1915, the county organization was effected. The name refers to the Missouri Slope, a geographical feature that is also a popular designation for western North Dakota, particularly the area west of the Missouri River.

Geography

Slope County lies on the lower west side of North Dakota. Its west boundary line abuts the east boundary line of the state of Montana. The Little Missouri River enters the county's north boundary line at its midpoint, and flows southwestward through Three V Crossing, and then southward through the county's western portion. Cedar Creek drains the southeastern portion of the county, flowing southerly into Bowman County.

Slope County terrain consists of semi-arid rough hills and gullies interspersed with lower hills, part of which is dedicated to agriculture. The terrain slopes to the east and south; its highest area (except for isolated prominences, such as White Butte) is its northwestern corner, at 3,104' (945m) ASL.

White Butte, the highest natural point in North Dakota at an elevation of 3506 ft (1062 m), is in southeast Slope County.

Major highways
  U.S. Highway 12
  U.S. Highway 85

National protected areas
 Little Missouri National Grassland (part)
 Stewart Lake National Wildlife Refuge
 White Lake National Wildlife Refuge

Adjacent counties
 Billings County - north
 Stark County - northeast
 Hettinger County - east
 Adams County - southeast
 Bowman County - south
 Fallon County, Montana - west
 Golden Valley County - northwest

Lakes
 Cedar Lake
 White Lake

Demographics

2000 census
As of the 2000 census, there were 767 people, 313 households, and 222 families in the county. The population density was 0.63 people per square mile (0.14/km2). There were 451 housing units at an average density of 0.37 per square mile (0.24/km2). The racial makeup of the county was 99.84% White, 0.08% Native American, and 0.13% from two or more races. 0.08% of the population were Hispanic or Latino of any race. Slope County has the highest percentage white population of any U.S. county. 46.9% were of German, 15.2% Norwegian, 8.1% American, 7.4% English and 7.2% Swedish ancestry.

There were 313 households, out of which 30.0% had children under the age of 18 living with them, 64.5% were married couples living together, 3.8% had a female householder with no husband present, and 28.8% were non-families. 27.2% of all households were made up of individuals, and 10.5% had someone living alone who was 65 years of age or older. The average household size was 2.45 and the average family size was 2.96.

The county population contained 25.3% under the age of 18, 4.2% from 18 to 24, 25.0% from 25 to 44, 27.6% from 45 to 64, and 17.9% who were 65 years of age or older. The median age was 42 years. For every 100 females there were 116.7 males. For every 100 females age 18 and over, there were 117.0 males.

The median income for a household in the county was $24,667, and the median income for a family was $26,058. Males had a median income of $20,000 versus $12,115 for females. The per capita income for the county was $14,513. About 15.40% of families and 16.90% of the population were below the poverty line, including 16.30% of those under age 18 and 8.00% of those age 65 or over.

2010 census
As of the 2010 census, there were 727 people, 326 households, and 224 families in the county. The population density was 0.60/sqmi (0.23/km2). There were 436 housing units at an average density of 0.36/sqmi (0.14/km2). The racial makeup of the county was 97.5% white, 2.2% American Indian, 0.0% from other races, and 0.3% from two or more races. Those of Hispanic or Latino origin made up 1.7% of the population. In terms of ancestry, 53.9% were of German, 30.7% Norwegian, 9.9% English, 7.4% Swedish, 5.5% Polish and 2.8% American ancestry.

Of the 326 households, 22.4% had children under the age of 18 living with them, 60.7% were married couples living together, 4.9% had a female householder with no husband present, 31.3% were non-families, and 29.4% of all households were made up of individuals. The average household size was 2.23 and the average family size was 2.74. The median age was 49.2 years.

The median income for a household in the county was $43,625 and the median income for a family was $55,833. Males had a median income of $36,458 versus $31,172 for females. The per capita income for the county was $24,824. About 6.8% of families and 10.5% of the population were below the poverty line, including 9.3% of those under age 18 and 11.7% of those age 65 or over.

Communities

Cities
 Amidon (county seat)
 Marmarth

Unincorporated communities
 De Sart
 Mound
 Pierce

Politics
Slope County voters have traditionally voted Republican. In no national election since 1964 has the county selected the Democratic Party candidate (as of 2020). In 2020 Donald Trump received 89% of the vote in Slope County.

Education
School districts include:
 Bowman County Public School District 1
 New England Public School District 9
 Scranton Public School District 33
 Marmarth Public School District 12 (elementary only)

Former school districts:
 Central Elementary Public School District 32 (Amidon Elementary School) - Scheduled to dissolve on July 1, 2020. It was divided between Bowman County School District No. 1 and New England School District No. 9.
 Sheets Public School District 14 (Cottage School)

The Amidon and Cottage schools were the final two schools remaining in the county.

Gallery

See also
 National Register of Historic Places listings in Slope County, North Dakota
 Yule Ranch

References
Specific

General
 "Slope Saga", Slope Saga Committee, 1976, Pioneer Print, Bowman County Pioneer

External links

 
1915 establishments in North Dakota
Populated places established in 1915